Nikad robom, vazda taxijem – Best of 1: Najveći Hitovi '84.–'89. is the first "best-of" compilation album and by Bosnian and former Yugoslav rock band Zabranjeno Pušenje, released in 1996. It's released through TLN-Europa.

Track listing
Source: Discogs

Personnel 
Credits adapted from the album's liner notes.

Production
 Sejo Sexon – production
 Mustafa Čengić Mujo Snažni – production
 Mahmut Paša Ferović – production
 Sven Rustempašić – production
Design
 Zenit Đozić – design, photos  
 Srđan Velimirović – design, photos

References

1996 compilation albums
1996 greatest hits albums
Zabranjeno Pušenje albums